The Shaowu dialect is a dialect of Shao-Jiang Min Chinese spoken in Shaowu, Nanping in northwestern Fujian province of China. It combines elements from Northern Min and Gan Chinese.

Phonology
The Shaowu dialect has 20 initials, 46 rimes and 6 tones.

Initials

Rimes

Tones

References

Min Chinese